Cardiastethus borealis is a species of minute pirate bug in the family Lyctocoridae. It is mostly found in North America.

References

Further reading

 

Lyctocoridae
Articles created by Qbugbot
Insects described in 1977